Aldair Sanchez (born  July 6, 2002), is an American soccer player who plays as a defender for Sacramento Republic.

Club career
After playing with the Portland Timbers academy from 2015 to 2020,Sanchez appeared as an 80th-minute substitute for Portland's USL Championship side Portland Timbers 2 on August 31, 2019 in a 3-1 win over Reno 1868.

Personal life
Born in the United States, Sanchez is of Mexican descent.

References

External links
 

2002 births
Living people
Association football defenders
American soccer players
Portland Timbers 2 players
Soccer players from Washington (state)
USL Championship players
Sportspeople from Vancouver, Washington
North Carolina Tar Heels men's soccer players
American sportspeople of Mexican descent
USL League Two players
Sacramento Republic FC players